The Little Saco River is a  tributary of the Saco River in western Maine in the United States. It begins at the junction of Haley Brook and Paine Brook in the northern part of the town of Brownfield and flows northeast, entering the town of Fryeburg just before its mouth at the Saco.

See also
List of rivers of Maine

References

Maine Streamflow Data from the USGS
Maine Watershed Data From Environmental Protection Agency

Rivers of Maine
Saco River
Rivers of Oxford County, Maine